Rajdev Singh is an Indian politician and belonged to Shiromani Akali Dal (Taksali).He was elected to the Lok Sabha, lower house of the Parliament of India from Sangrur in Punjab on the ticket of Shiromani Akali Dal (Simranjit Singh Mann)

References

External links
Profile on Lok Sabha website

1951 births
Lok Sabha members from Punjab, India
India MPs 1989–1991
Living people
Shiromani Akali Dal politicians
Aam Aadmi Party politicians from Punjab, India
Bharatiya Janata Party politicians from Punjab